The Men's long jump event  at the 2011 European Athletics Indoor Championships was held on March 4, 2011, at 10:50 (qualification) and March 5, 16:25 (final) local time.

Records

Results

Qualification
Qualifying perf. 8.05 (Q) or 8 best performers (q) advanced to the Final
The qualification was held at 10:50.

Final
The final was held on March 5 at 16:25.

References

Long jump at the European Athletics Indoor Championships
2011 European Athletics Indoor Championships